The 1908 Holy Cross football team was an American football team that represented the College of the Holy Cross in the 1908 college football season.

In their second year under head coach Timothy F. Larkin, the team compiled a 4–4 record. Daniel J. Triggs was the team captain.

After three years of sharing its home field with the college's baseball team, Holy Cross' football team moved its home games to a new stadium, also called Fitton Field, beyond the baseball team's right-field fence. 

Mayor James Logan was present to blow the first whistle at the September 25 debut of the new football stadium on the college campus in Worcester, Massachusetts.

Schedule

References

Holy Cross
Holy Cross Crusaders football seasons
Holy Cross football